Adžić is a Serbo-Croatian surname. It may refer to:

Blagoje Adžić (born 1932), Yugoslav People's Army general
Dragan Adžić, Montenegrin handball player and coach
Dara Bubamara (born Radojka Adžić, 1976), Serbian singer
Ivan Adžić, Serbian footballer
Luka Adžić, Serbian footballer
Željko Adžić, Croatian footballer
Gojko Adzic, Serbian consultant and author of Specification by Example
Jelena Adzic, Canadian journalist and on-air personality

Serbian surnames